Mulino State Airport  is a public airport located at Mulino, Oregon, near the city of Molalla, about 20 nautical miles (23 mi, 37 km) south of Portland with access from Interstate 205 via Oregon Route 213. Also known as Mulino Airport, it was owned by the Port of Portland from 1988 until it was transferred to the Oregon Department of Aviation on July 1, 2009. It was previously also known as Portland-Mulino Airport.

Overview
This airport is included in the National Plan of Integrated Airport Systems for 2011–2015, which categorized it as a general aviation facility. It is home to over 40 light general aviation aircraft (including weekend glider activities) with 34 existing aircraft T-hangars and approximately 25 tie-down spots. Mulino is also home to the Mulino Chapter of the Oregon Pilot Association.

Facilities and aircraft 
Mulino State Airport covers an area of 275 acres (111 ha) at an elevation of 260 feet (79 m) above mean sea level. It has one runway designated 14/32 with an asphalt surface measuring 3,425 by 100 feet (1,044 x 30 m).

For the 12-month period ending April 23, 2009, the airport had 21,300 general aviation aircraft operations, an average of 58 per day. At that time there were 47 aircraft based at this airport: 96% single-engine and 4% glider.

See also 
 Portland International Airport
 Portland-Troutdale Airport
 Pearson Field
 Hillsboro Airport

References

External links 
 Mulino (4S9) at Oregon Department of Aviation
 Mulino Airport at Port of Portland
 Aerial image as of July 2001 from USGS The National Map
 

Airports in Clackamas County, Oregon
Port of Portland (Oregon)